Ghazi Al Kuwari  is a Bahrain football defender who played for Bahrain in the 2004 Asian Cup. He also played for East Riffa Club, Riffa SC, Al Ahli and Busaiteen Club.

External links

11v11 Profile
Football Database Profile

1977 births
Living people
Bahraini footballers
Association football defenders
Bahrain international footballers
2004 AFC Asian Cup players
east Riffa Club players
riffa SC players
Al-Ahli Club (Manama) players
Busaiteen Club players